Predrag Milošević (1964–15 April 2017) was a politician in Serbia. He was the mayor of Sečanj from 2004 to 2017 and a member of the Assembly of Vojvodina from 2008 to 2012. At different times in his career, Milošević was an independent politician, a member of the Democratic Party (Demokratska stranka, DS), and a member of the Serbian Progressive Party (Srpska napredna stranka, SNS).

Early life and private career
Milošević was raised in and around Novi Sad, Vojvodina, in what was then the Socialist Republic of Serbia in the Socialist Federal Republic of Yugoslavia. He was a graduate of the University of Novi Sad Faculty of Law.

Politician
Milošević was first elected as mayor of Sečanj as an independent candidate in the 2004 Serbian local elections, in which Serbia introduced the direct election of mayors. Direct mayoral elections were subsequently abandoned; Milošević led his own For the Development of the Municipality of Sečanj electoral list in the 2008 Serbian local elections and was chosen as mayor for a second term with the support of the DS and G17 Plus. He was also elected to the Vojvodina provincial assembly in the 2008 provincial election as an independent candidate and served for the next four years. He did not seek re-election at the provincial level in 2012.

Milošević had joined the Democratic Party by the time of the 2012 local elections and led the party to a majority victory in Sečanj, after which he was chosen for a third term as mayor. The DS became mired in divisions over the next two years, and in January 2014 Milošević crossed over to the Progressive Party, bringing most of the local DS organization with him. He led the SNS to a majority victory in the municipality in the 2016 local elections and was confirmed as mayor once again.

Death
Milošević died on 15 April 2017 following a short and serious illness.

Electoral record

Provincial (Vojvodina)

Municipality of Sečanj

References

1964 births
2017 deaths
People from Sečanj
Mayors of places in Serbia
Members of the Assembly of Vojvodina
Democratic Party (Serbia) politicians
Serbian Progressive Party politicians